King George V Memorial Gardens may refer to:

 King George V Memorial Park, Hong Kong, Sai Ying Pun, Hong Kong
 King George V Memorial Park, Kowloon, Hong Kong